Percy Dobell (29 April 1864 – 5 January 1903) was an English cricketer active from 1886 to 1887 who played for Lancashire. He was born in Huyton and died in Liverpool. He appeared in ten first-class matches as a righthanded batsman, scoring 142 runs with a highest score of 28, and held four catches.

Notes

1864 births
1903 deaths
English cricketers
Lancashire cricketers
Liverpool and District cricketers